The 41st International Film Festival of India was held from 22 November – 2 December 2010 in Goa. Veteran director Yash Chopra was the chief guest for this edition. The "Cannes Kaleidoscope 2010"  was the highlight of the 41st edition. The "Best Actress" and "Best Actor" awards were re-instituted from this edition. The 41st edition paid homage to veteran French filmmaker Eric Rohmer. Six of his feature films were part of the festival.  The platinum jubilee of Oriya Cinema was Commemorated and 26 Feature Films were screened. The edition also marked the commemoration of the Golden Jubilee of the Film & Television Institute of India.

Winners
Golden Peacock (Best Film):  "Moner Manush" by "Gautam Ghose" (Bengali film)
IFFI Best Actor Award (Female): Silver Peacock Award: "Magdalena Boczarska" for "Little Rose"
IFFI Best Actor Award (Male): Silver Peacock Award: "Güven Kıraç" for "The Crossing"
Silver Peacock Special Jury Award: "Kaushik Ganguly" for  "Arekti Premer Golpo" (Indian film) and "Taika Waititi"  for the "Boy" (Kiwi film)
IFFI Best Director Award: Silver Peacock Award: "Susanne Bier" for "In a Better World" (Danish film)

Official selections

Special screenings

Opening film
"West is West" by "Andy De Emmony" (British film).

Closing film
 "The Princess of Montpensier" by "Bertrand Tavernier" (French film).

References

2010 film festivals
41st
2010 in Indian cinema